Pareronia  boebera is a species of pierine butterfly endemic to the Philippines.

Subspecies
P. b. boebera (Philippines: Luzon)
P. b. bazilana (Fruhstorfer, 1900) (Philippines: Basilan)
P. b. arsamota (Fruhstorfer, 1910) (Philippines: Negros)
P. b. elaitia (Fruhstorfer, 1910) (Philippines: Panaon)
P. b. joloana Fruhstorfer, 1911 (Jolo Island)
P. b. trinobantes Fruhstorfer, 1911 (Philippines: Mindanao)

References

External links
 Images representing Pareronia boebera at Encyclopedia of Life

boebera
Butterflies described in 1821